Norbert Sándor Balogh (born 21 February 1996) is a Hungarian footballer who plays as a forward for Vasas on loan from the Slovak club DAC Dunajská Streda, and the Hungarian national team.

Club career
Balogh grew up in very poor circumstances in Hajdúböszörmény, Hajdú County, Hungary. His parents did not earn enough money, therefore he often starved. Balogh's parents could not afford to buy new shoes for him, therefore he was often mocked at school. In an interview with Nemzeti Sport, Balogh said that he did not mind that he was brought up in poor circumstances because as an adult he can appreciate the success more. But he never forgets where he comes from. He is still in touch with his old friends from his birthplace. He remembers during the summers he played football with his friends even if they did not have food. He started playing football in the football club of Hajdúböszörmény and he was spotted during an exhibition match by László Arany, who invited him to go to the academy of Debreceni VSC.
When he was 17 he got a contract from Debrecen and he rented a flat there. He sent some of his earning to his parents who got divorced. When he was selected for the first squad of the club his father had to go to prison which hurt Balogh. His father is an important person in his life because he taught him a lot and persuaded him to become a footballer.

Debrecen

Early career
On 1 August 2014, Balogh debuted in the 2014–15 Nemzeti Bajnokság I season against MTK Budapest in a 1–0 defeat at the Bozsik József Stadion. On 17 May 2015, he scored his first and second goal for Debrecen in the 2014–15 Nemzeti Bajnokság I season in a 4–0 victory against Lombard-Pápa TFC. In the 2015–16 Nemzeti Bajnokság I season, Balogh finished on the top in many statistics. He engaged in most battles (605) among which he won 250 (overtook only by Suljic). On 26 December 2015, Balogh was invited to see the 2015-16 Premier League match between Chelsea F.C. and Watford F.C. On 9 January 2016, Ajax Amsterdam offered Debreceni VSC 1.5 million € to purchase Balogh.

Palermo
On 13 January 2016, Balogh was signed by Serie A club U.S. Città di Palermo. The transfer fee was €2,200,000.

APOEL FC 
On 21 August 2018, he was loaned to the Cypriot First Division club APOEL. On 3 December 2018, he played his first match in the 2018–19 Cypriot First Division in a 5–1 victory against Apollon Limassol at the GSP Stadium, Nicosia. He entered the pitch in 67th minute as a substitute for Léo Natel. On 19 December 2018, Balogh scored his first goal against Ayia Napa FC in the first round of the 2018–19 Cypriot Cup in the GSP Stadium, Nicosia. On 20 February 2019, he scored twice against Doxa Katokopias FC in a Cypriot Cup match. On 24 February 2019 he scored his first goal in the Cypriot First Division away to AEL Limassol.

Following Palermo's exclusion from the Serie B, he was released together with all other players in July 2019, thus becoming a free agent.

Hull City
On 14 September 2019, after a week of training with the team, it was announced ahead of Hull City's home game against Wigan Athletic that Balogh had signed permanently with The Tigers, on a one-year deal, with an option for a further 12 months. He made his debut on 23 October 2019, in a 1–2 away win against Nottingham Forest when he came on as a substitute for Jon Toral. On 29 May 2020, he left the club by mutual consent.

Vasas
On 14 February 2023, Balogh joined Vasas on loan.

International career
Balogh was a member of the Hungarian U-19 squad at the 2014 UEFA European Under-19 Championship.

Career statistics

Club

International

Honours
APOEL
Cypriot First Division: 2018–19

References

External links
MLSZ 

1996 births
Sportspeople from Hajdú-Bihar County
Living people
Hungarian footballers
Hungary youth international footballers
Hungary under-21 international footballers
Hungary international footballers
Association football forwards
Debreceni VSC players
Létavértes SC players
Palermo F.C. players
APOEL FC players
Hull City A.F.C. players
Budapest Honvéd FC players
FC DAC 1904 Dunajská Streda players
Vasas SC players
Nemzeti Bajnokság I players
Serie A players
Serie B players
Cypriot First Division players
English Football League players
Slovak Super Liga players
Hungarian expatriate footballers
Expatriate footballers in Italy
Hungarian expatriate sportspeople in Italy
Expatriate footballers in Cyprus
Hungarian expatriate sportspeople in Cyprus
Expatriate footballers in England
Hungarian expatriate sportspeople in England
Expatriate footballers in Slovakia
Hungarian expatriate sportspeople in Slovakia